Current Opinion in Colloid & Interface Science is a bimonthly peer-reviewed scientific journal published by Elsevier. It covers the field of physical chemistry, especially research on colloids and interfaces. The journal was established in 1996 and the editors-in-chiefs are Dganit Danino and Marie Pierre Krafft. According to the Journal Citation Reports, the journal has a 2020 impact factor of 6.448.

See also
 Advances in Colloid and Interface Science
 Current Opinion (Elsevier)
 Journal of Colloid and Interface Science

References

External links
 

Elsevier academic journals
Bimonthly journals
Physical chemistry journals
Publications established in 1996
English-language journals